Réka Rohács (born 28 May 2000) is a Hungarian swimmer. She competed in the women's 5 km and women's 10 km events at the 2019 World Aquatics Championships held in Gwangju, South Korea. In the 5 km event she finished in 18th place and in the 10 km event she finished in 22nd place.

In 2021, she won the bronze medal in the team relay event at the 2020 European Aquatics Championships held in Budapest, Hungary. She also competed in the women's 10 km event.

References 

Living people
2000 births
Place of birth missing (living people)
Hungarian female long-distance swimmers
European Aquatics Championships medalists in swimming
World Aquatics Championships medalists in open water swimming
21st-century Hungarian women